Madonna is the second studio album by the American band ...And You Will Know Us by the Trail of Dead. It was released on October 19, 1999, by Merge Records.

Background and production
The cover art features a Hindu goddess painting by Conrad Keely called Portrait of Kali. The back art is another painting, Tribute to Ed Wicklander by James Neslo, a nod to a Seattle-based sculptor.

Critical reception
Trouser Press wrote that "a huge guitar sound (My Bloody Valentine huge) dominates, buttressed by swift drum rolls and snare cracks."

Track listing

Personnel
Conrad Keely
Jason Reece
Kevin Allen
Neil Busch (uncredited)
Additional musicians: Julie Pomerleau, Carolyn Cremona, Clay Embry, Jimmy Burdine (horns), Steven Hall (drums).

References

1999 albums
...And You Will Know Us by the Trail of Dead albums
Merge Records albums